Events from the year 1889 in Sweden

Incumbents
 Monarch – Oscar II
 Prime Minister – Gillis Bildt, Gustaf Åkerhielm

Events

 12 October Gustaf Åkerhielm assumed the position of prime minister
 - Sofia Kovalevskaya is appointed the first female university professor in Sweden.
 - The Yngsjö murder.
 - The Selander Company is founded.
 - Foundation of the Baptist Union of Sweden
 - First issue of the Stockholms-Tidningen
 - Foundation of the Royal Society of the Humanities.
 - The Swedish Social Democratic Party is founded. 
 - Women eligible to boards of public authority such as public school boards, public hospital boards, inspectors, poor care boards and similar positions.
 - Foundation of the Sophiahemmet hospital in Stockholm.

Births
 23 May – Boo Kullberg, gymnast (died 1962).
 18 October – Carl Bertilsson, gymnast (died 1968).
 18 December - Alice Habsburg

Deaths 
 14 July – Elma Ström, Swedish opera singer (born 1822) 
 - Sophia Wilkens, pioneer in the education of students with Intellectual disability (born 1817)
 - Amalia Assur, first female dentist   (born 1803)

References

 
Years of the 19th century in Sweden
Sweden